Mucilaginibacter daejeonensis is a Gram-negative, facultatively aerobic, heterotrophic, non-spore-forming, rod-shaped and non-motile bacterium from the genus of Mucilaginibacter which has been isolated from a dried rice straw.

References

External links
Type strain of Mucilaginibacter daejeonensis at BacDive -  the Bacterial Diversity Metadatabase

Sphingobacteriia
Bacteria described in 2009